Yaroslav Ivanovych Pavulyak (30 April 1948 – 25 November 2010), also known as "Jaroslav Pavuliak", was a Ukrainian poet.

Life
He was born in the village of Nastasiv in Ternopil, western Ukraine. He attended art school in Lviv, focusing on ceramics. He graduated in 1967. And began working at different galleries and craftwork sites while also doing various restoration work.
In 1969, he built a statue of Taras Shevchenko in Nastasiv which led to a severe prosecution of his family by KGB. He was threatened and put under house arrest for two months. Later, he attended the University of Chernivtsy. In December 1971 he was fired because he was again promoting Ukrainian language and culture. He restarted his studies in 1972 at the Department of Teaching at the University of Kamianets-Podilskyi, where he was again forced to leave for the same reason as he left Tchernivtsy. 

In 1973 he was accepted to the Maxim Gorky Literature Institute in Moscow. After graduating and marrying a Czechoslovakian citizen, he relocated to the former Czechoslovakia where he worked at a literary agency, LITA. Later he returned to Ukraine. He worked as a director of a Museum of Political Prisoners and Victims of Communist Regime in Ternopil. He was a member of The National Writers' Union of Ukraine and the Society of Ukrainian Writers in Slovakia (Spolok ukrajinských spisovateľov na Slovensku).

Death
He died at his home in Ternopil, aged 62.

Literary work
Pavulyak wrote three books of poems, available at: https://pavulyak.wordpress.com/poetry/ 
 Блудний лебідь – Bludniy lebid (1993)
 Mогили на конях – Mohyly na konyax (1999)
 Дороги додому – Dorohy dodomu: Poezii. Poemy (2009)

External links
Yaroslav Pavulyak website

Documentary regarding the life and work of Yaroslav Pavulyak:

– Ярослав Павуляк. Дороги додому. Док. фільм 
 
Interview of Yaroslav Pavulyak led by Petro Soroka:

– part 1
– part 2
– part 3

Interview with Yaroslav's wife Oleksandra Filinska:

Вечір пам'яті Я. Павуляка

Yaroslav's poem "Pidoshva" as performed by theatre ГаРмИдЕр:

– Ярослав Павуляк, поема "Підошва" (Тернопіль, 1969 рік)

To the Memory of Yaroslav Pavulyak – performance of the students of the Ternopil Ivan Franko High School:

– Поетично-музична композиція студентів ТНПУ в Тернопільській Українській гімназії ім. І. Франка

Artists from Ternopil
Poets
Ukrainian poets
1948 births
2010 deaths
Ukrainian studies
Maxim Gorky Literature Institute alumni